Kang Yong Sop (October 15, 1931 – January 21, 2012) was a North Korean politician, second son of deputy prime minister Kang Ryang-uk and Song Sok-jong. He was also vice-president of the North Korean branch of the Pan-Korean Alliance for Reunification (PKAR), delegate to 12th Supreme People's Assembly (SPA) and member of the SPA Presidium, and director of the Pyongyang Theological Academy.

Career
In January 1969, Kang was appointed to deputy bureau manager in the Cabinet administrative bureau. He became ambassador to Romania in 1969, and to Malta in 1971.

Kang served as chair of the central committee of the Korean Christian Federation (KCF) starting in February 1989, vice-president of the  starting in May 1989, and chair of the KCF central committee in May 1990. He served as a member of the unification policy committee of the Supreme People's Assembly (SPA) starting in May 1990, and as a member of the central committee of the North Korean branch of the Pan-Korean Alliance for Reunification (PKAR). In March 1991, he was appointed to the directorship of the Pyongyang Theological Academy.

Starting in July 1991, he served as vice-president of the DPRK-Japan Friendship Association, and as a member of the central committee of the Democratic Front for the Reunification of the Fatherland. He became vice-chair of the PKAR in August 1993, and served as deputy chair of the North Korean committee for implementation of the June 15th North–South Joint Declaration. He died in Pyongyang of a heart attack on January 21, 2012.

After being elected to the 9th Supreme People's Assembly in April 1990, Kang served in the 10th (1998), 11th (2003), and 12th (2009) sessions of the SPA as delegate and member of the SPA Presidium. He was a member of the national mourning committees for the deaths of Kim Il-sung in 1994, Ri In-mo in 2007, and Pak Song-chol in 2008.

Awards
Kang was awarded the Order of Kim Il-sung in March 2002, and the National Reunification Prize in September 2003.

References

1931 births
2012 deaths
People from Pyongyang
North Korean politicians
North Korean Christians
Ambassadors of North Korea to Romania
Ambassadors of North Korea to Malta